Paari is a 2000 Indian Meitei language film written by Aribam Gautam and directed by Aribam Syam Sharma. The movie stars R.K. Surchandra in the lead role. This children film is produced by Children's Film Society, India. The movie participated at National Children's Film Festival (NCFF) 2010, Guwahati; 2nd Children's Film Festival and 4th Children's Film Festival 2013, Imphal. Paari was among the films screened at the International Film Festival of India (IFFI) 2015 under the section A special retrospective on ace filmmaker Aribam Syam Sharma.

Paari is the first Manipuri children film.

Cast
 Master R.K. Surchandra as Sanathoi
 Master Telem Imotomba as Tomba
 Master G. Ashutosh as Tomba, Friend of Sanathoi
 Master Jiban as Son of Choukidar
 Lourembam Keshworjit as Iboyaima
 Salam Birendra as Idhou (Grandfather)
 L. Brajabidhu as Sanathoi's father
 Sagolsem Meenakumari as Sanathoi's mother
 Sarojini Shija as Tomba's mother
 Tongbram Babudhon as Forest Choukidar
 M. Kanhaibabu as Forest Guard-I
 Lourembam Boy (Devid) as Doctor
 M. Tomba as Oja Tomba
 R.K. Sanayaima as Sangai Ningthou

References

2000 films
Films directed by Aribam Syam Sharma
Meitei-language films
Meitei folklore in popular culture